Benstead is a surname. Notable people with the surname include:

Christopher Benstead, British audio engineer 
Graham Benstead (born 1963), British footballer 
John Benstead (trade unionist) (1897–1979), English trade unionist
Lulu Benstead (1891–1983), Australian opera singer